Eparchius may refer to:
Eparchius Avitus (†456/7), Roman emperor from 455 to 456
Saint Eparchius (†581), Christian hermit